Courtney Johnson (born May 7, 1974 in Salt Lake City, Utah) is an American water polo player, who competed in the 2000 Olympics where women's water polo made its debut.  She won a silver medal at the 2000 Summer Olympics. She competed at the 1998 World Championships in Perth, Australia and the 2001 World Championships In Fukuoka, Japan.  She won a silver medal at the 1999 Pan American Games in Winnipeg, Canada.

Courtney Johnson attended the University of California, Berkeley.  She competed on University of California, Berkeley's first Varsity Women's Water Polo team in 1996.  She was coached by soon to be Olympic teammate Maureen Mendoza and led the team to a second-place finish at the Collegiate National Championship Tournament.  Johnson was named the Collegiate National Championship Most Valuable Player.  She was also honored as the MPSF Northern Division Player of the Year, Western Regional Most Valuable Player and NCAA First Team All-American.  She was named the Daily Californian Female Athlete of the Year.   Johnson was the Most Valuable Player for the California Golden Bears for three-straight years (1994–96).  In 2010 she was inducted in the University of California Hall of Fame. Johnson will be inducted into the Utah Sports Hall of Fame, class of 2021.  

After graduating from the University of California, Berkeley in 1996, Johnson attended law school at Duquesne University School of Law in Pittsburgh, PA.  She used her final year of college eligibility and competed on the Duquesne University Swim Team during the 1996–1997 season.  Johnson then transferred to Santa Clara University School of Law where she graduated in 2001.  During law school Johnson was the volunteer assistant coach at Stanford University.  She was on the coaching staff for the inaugural NCAA Women's Water Polo Championship in 1999.  She is currently a member of the California State Bar.

Courtney Johnson was a member of the United States Olympic Committee Athletes' Advisory Council from 2000–2008.  She served on the United States Olympic Committee AAC Executive Committee from 2004–2008.  She was a member of the USOC/NCAA Joint Task Force in 2004 and a member of the USOC Governance Task Force in 2010.  Johnson continues to volunteer with the USOC and serves on the United States Olympic Committee Nominating and Governance Committee.  She spent four years in NCAA Compliance at Saint Mary's College of California and two years as the Executive Director of Operations for California Magic Soccer Club. She currently lives in Dallas, Texas with her family.

See also
 List of Olympic medalists in water polo (women)

References

External links
 

1974 births
American female water polo players
Living people
California Golden Bears women's water polo players
Sportspeople from Salt Lake City
Water polo players at the 2000 Summer Olympics
Olympic silver medalists for the United States in water polo
Medalists at the 2000 Summer Olympics